En Moi (also known as In Me) is a 2016 French short film directed, written and produced by Laetitia Casta in her directorial debut.

The film had its world premiere at the closing ceremony of the 2016 Cannes International Critics' Week.

Plot
The filmmaker, portrayed by Yvan Attal, anxiously searches for inspiration on his film set among the Beaux-Arts architecture of the mysterious Palais Garnier where his imagination gives him the desire to have a yen for creating.

Cast
 Yvan Attal as the film director
 Lara Stone as the woman
 Arthur Igual as the assistant
 Mathilde Bisson as the actress
 Jérémie Bélingard as the lover
 Akaji Maro 『麿赤兒』 as the handyman
 Nassim Amaouche as the driver

Production

Development
In March 2016, it was announced that Laetitia Casta would make her directorial debut with the film. Casta co-wrote the screenplay with Maud Ameline. The film was produced by Casta under the banner of Allarosa production, executively produced by Lionel Massol, and co-executive produced by Pauline Seigland of Films Grand Huit.

Casting
In March 2016, it was reported that the French actress Mathilde Bisson (Cactus Flower, Nearest to the Sun) would be starring in the film. She would be joined in the cast by Yvan Attal (Munich, The Interpreter, Rush Hour 3), Lara Stone, Arthur Igual, Paris Opera Ballet Danseur Étoile Jérémie Bélingard, Akaji Maro (Kill Bill), and Nassim Amaouche (Adieu Gary).

In May 2016, Casta gives the reasons for the choice of the leading actress Stone:

Filming

Principal photography for the film began in August 2015 in the Paris Opera.

Background 
Since the film’s release on 19 May 2016 at the Cannes Film Festival International Critics' Week, the original theatrical movie poster features Lara Stone and Yvan Attal.

References

External links
 

2016 films
French drama short films
2010s French-language films
Films set in France
Films set in Paris
2016 drama films
2016 directorial debut films
2016 short films
2010s French films